is a town located in Yaeyama District, Okinawa Prefecture, Japan.

The town includes all of the islands in the Yaeyama Islands excluding Ishigaki, Yonaguni, and the Senkaku Islands.  This includes the islands of Iriomote, Yubu, Taketomi, Kohama, Kuroshima, Hateruma, and Hatoma.  Although Ishigaki is not part of the town of Taketomi, the town hall is located there.

Transportation
Hateruma Airport is located on Hateruma Island in Taketomi.

Education

Combined elementary and junior high schools include:
 Funauki Elementary and Junior High School (竹富町立船浮小中学校) - Iriomote Island
 Hateruma Elementary and Junior High School (竹富町立波照間小中学校) - Hateruma
 Hatoma Elementary and Junior High School (竹富町立鳩間小中学校) - Hatoma
 Iriomote Elementary and Junior High School(竹富町立西表小中学校) - Iriomote Island
 Kohama Elementary and Junior High School (竹富町立小浜小中学校) - Kohama Island
 Kuroshima Elementary and Junior High School (竹富町立黒島小中学校) - Kuroshima Island
 Taketomi Elementary and Junior High School (竹富町立竹富小中学校) - Taketomi Island

Junior high schools include:
 Funaura Junior High School (竹富町立船浦中学校) - , Iriomote Island
 Ōhara Junior High School (竹富町立大原中学校) - , Iriomote Island

Elementary schools include:
 Komi Elementary School (竹富町立古見小学校) - , Iriomote Island
 Ohara Elementary School (竹富町立大原小学校) - Haemi
 Shirama Elementary School (竹富町立白浜小学校) - Shirahama (白浜), Iriomote Island
 Uehara Elementary School (竹富町立上原小学校) - Uehara

For public senior high school students may attend schools of the Okinawa Prefectural Board of Education.

References

External links

 Taketomi Island - october 2016 archive

Towns in Okinawa Prefecture